The Type 58 is an assault rifle made in North Korea derived from the Soviet AK-47 designed by Mikhail Kalashnikov. This was the first weapon made in North Korea alongside the PPSh-41, made under license as the Type 49. It was made in Factory 61 and 65 in Chongjin.

History
After the Korean War (1950–1953), North Korea was allied with the Soviet Union and continued to receive military support from them throughout the Cold War. President Kim Il-sung ordered the fabrication of the Type 58. The assault rifle was first produced in 1958. These were made initially with Soviet components until the North Koreans were able to make the parts on their own.

Before production of the Type 58 ceased, it's reported that around 800,000 were made. North Korea eventually turned production towards the Type 68 since it was getting too much time consuming to make the Type 58 even though the cost of labor to make the assault rifle is not a problem. Production eventually was halted in 1968 and shifted to the Type 68 in the same year.

The Type 58 was exported to Cuba and Vietnam in the 1960s before it showed up in parts of Africa, the Middle East and South America.

The Type 68 was reported to be exported to the Farabundo Martí National Liberation Front covertly in the 1980s.

Design

Type 58
While the Type 58 is based on the AK-47 with the milled receiver, the difference between the two assault rifles is that the former has identifying marks such as the five-point star in a circle and Type 58 in hangul. The Type 58 has a firing rate at 600-650 RPM.

The Type 58's quality of finish bluing depends, which usually ranges from average to poor.

Initial production models were not made with bayonet lugs. Later models were produced with said bayonet lugs.

Type 68
The Type 68 was made with features from the Type 58 with features such as the solid catalpa wood stock, wood pistol grip, handguards and smooth sheet-steel top covers. It has a swivel retaining bracket spot-welded on the left side of the receiver. The pistol grip stud and lower stock tang are riveted in place. The milled gas block is flat on both sides and, like the Type 58, has a sling swivel that extends outward from the left side. The folding stock variant of the Type 68 has the Soviet underfolding design with stamped steel struts and buttplate. The rear sights are graduated to a distance of 800 meters. The trigger group is not based on the Soviet AKM. Instead, the trigger is a double-hook design based on milled receiver-based AKs.

The rifle has a barrel length of 415 mm with a velocity of 715 m/s. Its rate of fire is at 40-100 RPM. While it has a sight range of 800 meters, its effective range is at 300 to 400 meters.

While Type 68s used hangul markings in the fire selectors, exported versions uses non-hangul markings with 1 for semi-auto and an infinity symbol for automatic fire. The markings consist of a five-point star in a circle and Type 68 in hangul.

Variants

Type 58-1
A variant of the Type 58 with a folding stock.

Type 68
The Type 68 also known as Type 68 NK, is a North Korean version of the AKM, it was adopted in 1968 to replace the Type 58. It has no rate reducer. It has its own bayonet, which is based on the AK-47 bayonet, but it has a different pommel mount for it. These bayonets were also issued in Cuba, which have green scabbards instead of tan scabbards, which is used the Korean People's Army.

Type 68-1
The Type 68-1 features a underfolding stock like the AKMS with holes in it to help reduce overall weight.

Users

: Known to have the Type 58 in the 1960s. It also received the Type 68.
 Grenada: Recovered by United States forces after Operation Urgent Fury.
: Sandinista Popular Army/Ejército Popular Sandinista. In addition to receiving Type 58s and Type 68s, they also received Type 68 magazine pouches and slings. 

: Type 68 used by Peruvian National Police, most refurbished by Desarrollos Industriales Casanave. Around 200 were modernized by DC as of 2012.
: Reported to be used by the former North Vietnamese military in the 1960s.

Non-State Actors
 Farabundo Martí National Liberation Front Also received Type 68 slings and ammunition pouches, probably from Nicaragua.

Gallery

Notes

References

Bibliography

 

Rifles of the Cold War
Infantry weapons of the Cold War
7.62×39mm assault rifles
Kalashnikov derivatives
Firearms of North Korea
Military equipment introduced in the 1950s